Gurdwara Nanak Piao is a historical Gurudwara located in north Delhi in India. This gurdwara sahib is dedicated to the first Sikh Guru, Sri Guru Nanak Dev Ji. Gurdwara Nanak Piao was built at the site, in the garden where Guru Nanak Dev camped when he visited Delhi in 1505 during the reign of Sultan Sikandar Lodi. It is on Rana Pratap Road (also known as Grand Trunk Road or GT Road). It is said that people flocked to the revered prophet and offered him and Bhai Mardana precious gifts and offerings. Guru Nanak Dev Ji used to distribute all these offerings to the poor and needy. Besides this, he used to offer food and water to the hungry and thirsty, hence the name of the shrine. The word "Piao" mean to "offer liquid to drink" and refers to the offering of water to all the thirsty who visited this shrine.

Even today, the Well used by the Guru is preserved and one can still see the well from which Guru Nanak served water at the shrine. Consequently, over time Gurdwara Nank Piao attained a status of a holy and revered historical shrine. Guru Nanak Dev was an apostle of peace, brotherhood, non-violence and amity. His sermons created very uplifting and healthy impact on the people who bowed before him as respect for his spiritual guidance. The garden surrounding the Gurdwara became a place of pilgrimage for the people from all over Delhi. This is where they received the message of spiritual deliverance.

History

A story goes that during his stay in Delhi, rumours spread that Guru Nanak by the grace of God had revived a dead elephant. Emperor Sikander Shah Lodi learned of this holy man who had won the admiration of all the Hindu and Muslim divines of Delhi and had brought a dead elephant to life. It is said that when one of his favourite royal elephants died, he sent for the Guru and requested him to revive his elephant too. But the Guru refused to oblige him. Consequently, the Guru was immediately imprisoned. In the prison his deep compassion for the suffering of prisoners had a great moral and spiritual influence on the prison officials. They informed the Emperor that Guru Nanak was not an idolater and that as a saint he was greatly respected all the people including Hindus and Muslims.

A strange thing happened during the imprisonment of Guru Nanak. A great earthquake shook the capital on 3 July 1505. According to a chronicler "the mountains were overturned and lofty edifices were dashed to the ground. The living thought the day of judgment had come and for dead the day of resurrection". Many thought that the new Faqir Nanak who had been imprisoned by the Emperor had cursed the King and the empire. This or some other equally strong influence like the intervention of the Chisti Sufi saints changed the mind of Emperor and he ordered the release of the Guru Nanak and at his request many other prisoners were released with the Guru.

Gurdwaras in Delhi
Memorials to Guru Nanak